KXWI (98.5 MHz) is a radio station licensed to Williston, North Dakota, which serves northwestern North Dakota and northeastern Montana. The station airs a country music/news format and it’s morning show, hosted by Tom Simon, is the most listened to show in the Bakken. Owned by Williston Community Broadcasting. It began broadcasting in 2014.

References

External links
Marks Radio Group

XWI
Country radio stations in the United States
Radio stations established in 2014
2014 establishments in North Dakota